Ann Mincieli is a recording and mix engineer. She is best known for her work with Alicia Keys. Mincieli has three Grammy Awards and five nominations.

Work with Alicia Keys 
Mincieli is co-founder of Jungle City Studios with Alicia Keys. She is a partner with Alicia Keys in She Is the Music, a non-profit organization to increase the number of women in the music industry.

References 

Living people
Year of birth missing (living people)
Place of birth missing (living people)
Grammy Award winners
American audio engineers